Annie McCarer Darlington (Biles; after marriage, Mrs. F. J. Darlington; pen name, Gertrude St. Orme; July 20, 1836 – January 24, 1907) was an American poet. She was a frequest contributor to Cecil County, Maryland periodicals. Darlington died in 1907.

Biography
Her parents were Charles Biles and Catharine Ross Biles. Annie was a first cousin of Ida McCormick, their mothers being sisters. 

On November 20, 1860, she married Francis James Darlington (1840–1897), of West Chester, Pennsylvania, and spent the next five years on a farm near Unionville, Chester County, Pennsylvania. The family then took up their residence near Westtown Friends' Boarding School, where they spent the summer season. During the winter, they resided in the town of Melrose, Florida on the banks of Lake Santa Fe.

Darlington began to write poetry when about eighteen years of age, and was a frequent contributor to The Cecil Democrat and the Cecil Whig, under the nom de plume of "Gertrude St. Orme".

Anna McCarer Darlington died January 24, 1907, and was buried in West Chester.

References

1836 births
19th-century American poets
People from Cecil County, Maryland
19th-century pseudonymous writers
Pseudonymous women writers
19th-century American women writers
American women poets
1907 deaths